The Landsmannschaft der Deutschen aus Russland ("Territorial Association of Germans from Russia", "Homeland Association of Germans from Russia") is an organization of German refugees expelled from their homes in Russia to West Germany after World War II.

The organization is based in Stuttgart, and it was founded in 1950.

See also 
Expulsion of Germans after World War II
Federation of Expellees
Flight and expulsion of Germans (1944–1950)

External links 
 Official website

Landsmannschaften